Prodăneşti may refer to several villages in Romania:

 Prodăneşti, a village in Berești-Meria Commune, Galați County
 Prodăneşti, a village in Creaca Commune, Sălaj County
 Prodăneşti, a village in Ioneşti Commune, Vâlcea County

and to:

 Prodăneşti, a commune in Florești District, Moldova